Shoni may refer to:

Places
 Shoni Bay, Red Sea Riviera, Egypt
 Shaughnessy Village ("Shoni" for short), Montreal, Quebec, Canada

People
 Shōni clan, a family of Japanese nobles
 Shoni Jones, Welsh soccer player
 Shoni Schimmel (born 1992), U.S. basketball player
 Shoni Sguborfawr (1811–1858), Welsh criminal

See also

 
 Shani (disambiguation)
 Shonia